The first season of the Philippine reality dance competition World of Dance Philippines premiered on January 12, 2019, on ABS-CBN. Billy Crawford, Maja Salvador, and Gary Valenciano serve as the judges, with Luis Manzano and Pia Wurtzbach as hosts. The winning dance act received a prize of ₱2,000,000 and a chance to compete in World of Dance USA.

The inaugural season ended on April 7, 2019, with the FCPC Baliktanaw from the Team Division hailed as the winner.

Online show
An online show hosted by Maymay Entrata, Riva Quenery and AC Bonifacio titled World of Dance Online is aired simultaneously with the main show on World of Dance Philippines' Facebook and YouTube accounts.

Edward Barber, Awra Briguela, Jervi Li (also known as KaladKaren Davila) Jeremy Glinoga and Ylona Garcia served as guest hosts in the absence of the main hosts.

Dancers
Color key:

Junior (under 18)

Upper (18 and over, up to 4 members)

Team (18 and over, 5-15 members)

Qualifiers
The qualifier round took place between January 12, 2019 and February 17, 2019. In each round of the Qualifiers, the dance acts will perform a 2-minute routine in front of the judges and a live audience. They will be scored by the judges based on the following criteria: Performance, Technique, Choreography, Creativity & Presentation. Each criterion is worth 20 points with a perfect score of 100. For the dance act to move forward, they must receive an average score of 80 or higher.

Color key:

Episode 1 (January 12)

Episode 2 (January 13)

Episode 3 (January 19)

Episode 4 (January 20)

Episode 5 (January 26)

Episode 6 (January 27)

Episode 7 (February 2)

Episode 8 (February 3)

Episode 9 (February 9)

Episode 10 (February 10)

Episode 11 (February 16)

Episode 12 (February 17)

The Duels
In each round of The Duels, two acts in the same division compete for a spot in the next round. In each division, the acts with the top qualifying scores choose their opponents, then both acts perform back-to-back, receiving feedback from the judges. After each performance, the judges will score them in the 5 categories: Performance, Technique, Creativity, Choreography, and Presentation. The act with the highest average at the end of the duel moves on to the next round, the other faces immediate elimination.

Color key:

Color key:

The Cut
In The Cut, the 27 remaining acts compete for three spots in each of their divisions. As each dance act competes, their average score is displayed on a leaderboard for their division. Once a dance act's score falls out of the top 3, they face immediate elimination. For this round, each of the judges serve as mentors for one of the three divisions. Crawford mentored the Upper division; Salvador mentored the Junior division; and Valenciano worked with the Team division.

Asaf Goren withdrew from the competition due to an injury.

The Team division was split into two episodes due to time constraints.

Color key:

Color key:

Divisional Final
In the Divisional Final, the 3 remaining acts in each division will face each other. Only one act per division will proceed to the World Final. In this round, Salvador served as the mentor for the Team division, Crawford for the Junior division, and Valenciano for the Upper division.

The Junior division performances were split into two episodes – the first two in the Saturday episode and the last one in the Sunday episode.

Color key:

Color key:

World Final
In the World Final, the division champions will compete head-to-head for the 2-million-peso grand prize. The dance acts will compete in two rounds. In the first round, the assigned mentor will choose their performance song. In the second round, the dance act will choose their own song for the performance.

Valenciano mentored Luka & Jenalyn; Salvador mentored Ken San Jose; and Crawford mentored FCPC Baliktanaw.

Unlike other franchises, this round incorporates public vote in determining the winner. The viewers serve as the fourth judge. The viewers' vote will be converted to the 0–100 point scale. The viewers may vote through SMS and online. A maximum of one vote per method is implemented.

SMS
 Each act is assigned a unique voting code. The viewers may vote by texting the assigned code to 2366.

Online
 The user must have a Kapamilya account first. The viewers must then visit the ABS-CBN website. The photos of the acts will appear. Click the photo to vote for the act.

After all performances in each round, the voting lines will be opened for the whole commercial break only. The voting lines will also be closed after the commercial break and the scores will be shown on a leaderboard.

Color key:

Round 1 (Mentor's Choice)

Round 2 (Act's Choice)

Final Scores
Color key:

Galawang Pinoy
Galawang Pinoy was a post airing concert, that was aired on April 13 and 14, 2019.

Contestants who appeared on other shows 
 Luka & Jenalyn competed in seasons 1 and 2 of World of Dance.
 FMD Extreme competed in season 4 of It's Showtime, and season 6 of Pilipinas Got Talent.
 Dance Mate Xtreme competed in It's Showtime, season 5 of Pilipinas Got Talent, and season 2 of Asia's Got Talent.
 B2Win auditioned as individuals and debuted as a dance group on Star Hunt: The Grand Audition Show.
 Junior Hashtags auditioned as individuals and debuted as a dance group on It's Showtime.
Adriel & Alyza competed as Step Kids in Dance Kids.
Dhao Mac and Nate Porcalla competed in Dance Kids.
Asaf Goren competed in Celebrity Big Brother Israel 3 (which he won), Ninja Israel and The Challenge: Total Madness
Eiana Nova appeared in the Philippine version of Little Big Shots.

Ratings

References

2019 Philippine television seasons